Wolfgang Wosolsobe (1955 – 2018) was an Austrian army officer.

He led the Austrian military delegation to Brussels, between 2007 and 2012. He was appointed to a three-year term as Director-General of the Military Staff of the European Union, starting in 2013.

See also
 European External Action Service

References

Austrian generals
European Union diplomats
1955 births
2018 deaths
Directors General of the European Union Military Staff
Austrian officials of the European Union
Theresian Military Academy alumni